Christoph Martschinko (born 13 February 1994 in Lebring, Styria) is an Austrian professional footballer who plays as defender for Austria Wien II. His parents were Ukrainian immigrants.

Career
Martschinko started playing in the youth team of his local club SV Lebring and was transferred to the youth team of FC Red Bull Salzburg in 2008. In 2011, he made his first cap for the Red Bull Juniors, the second team of the club. In April 2012 he gained his first contract as professional player. 2012 he went out on loan to SC Wiener Neustadt where he had his debut in the first league on 15 September 2012 versus Wolfsberger AC.

Since 2009 he also played for various national teams (U16-U19).

Career statistics

Club

References

1994 births
Living people
Austrian footballers
Austria youth international footballers
Austria under-21 international footballers
Austrian people of Ukrainian descent
SC Wiener Neustadt players
SV Grödig players
FK Austria Wien players
Austrian Football Bundesliga players
2. Liga (Austria) players
Association football defenders